The American Journal of Forensic Medicine and Pathology is a peer-reviewed scientific journal published by Lippincott Williams & Wilkins (formerly Raven Press) covering research on forensic medicine and forensic pathology. The current editor-in-chief is D. Kimberley Molina.

Abstracting and indexing
The journal is abstracted and indexed in:

According to the Journal Citation Reports, the journal has an impact factor of 0.624.

References

External links
 

Quarterly journals
Publications established in 1980
English-language journals
Pathology journals
Wolters Kluwer academic journals